Christopher Erskin is a music video director and film director.

Filmography
 Johnson Family Vacation (2004)

Videography

1996
 Ginuwine  "Pony" 
 Total  "What About Us?"
 Blackstreet  "(Money Can't) Buy Me Love"

1997
 Rome  "I Belong to You (Every Time I See Your Face)"
 Allure featuring LL Cool J  "No Question"
 Uncle Sam  "Can You Feel It"
 Allure featuring 112  "All Cried Out"
 God's Property  "You Are the Only One"
 Queen Pen  "Man Behind the Music"
 Simone Hines  "Yeah! Yeah! Yeah!"
 Uncle Sam  "I Don't Ever Want to See You Again"
 Dru Hill  "We're Not Making Love No More"
 Queen Pen featuring Eric Williams  "All My Love"
 Joe  "Good Girls"

1998
 8Ball  "My Homeboy's Girlfriend"
 Debelah Morgan  "I Love You"
 Mic Geronimo featuring Sean "Puffy" Combs and Kelly Price  "Nothin' Move But the Money"
 Boyz II Men  "Doin' Just Fine"
 Jon B.  "They Don't Know"
 Nicole featuring Missy "Misdemeanor" Elliott and Mocha  "Make It Hot"
 MC Lyte  "I Can't Make a Mistake"
 Keith Sweat featuring Snoop Dogg  "Come and Get with Me"
 Nicole  "I Can't See"

1999
 Gerald Levert featuring Antoinette Roberson  "Taking Everything"

2000
 Brian McKnight  "6, 8, 12"
 R. Kelly  "I Wish" 
 T-Boz  "My Getaway"
 Public Announcement  "Man Ain't Supposed to Cry"

References

External links
 
 

English-language film directors
Living people
Music video directors
Place of birth missing (living people)
Year of birth missing (living people)